Takaoka Station is the name of multiple train or tram stations in Japan:

 Takaoka Station (Aichi) (高岳駅), a train station on the Sakura-dōri Line in Nagoya, Aichi
 Takaoka Station (Toyama) (高岡駅), a JR train station in Takaoka, Toyama
 Takaoka Station (Manyosen) (高岡駅), a Manyosen tram stop in Takaoka, Toyama

See also
 Nishi-Takaoka Station, a train station on the Ainokaze Toyama Line in Takaoka, Toyama
 Shin-Takaoka Station, a train station on the Hokuriku Shinkansen Line and Jōhana Line in Takaoka, Toyama
 Takaoka-Yabunami Station, a train station on the Ainokaze Toyama Line in Takaoka, Toyama